The boxlip mullet (Oedalechilus labeo) is a species of fish in the mullet family which is found in the eastern Atlantic from Gibraltar to Morocco, it is found in the Mediterranean Sea but not the Black Sea. It is the only species in the monospecific genus Oedalechilus.

References

External links
 
 

Mugilidae
Fish described in 1829
Taxa named by Georges Cuvier